Justine Henin-Hardenne was the defending champion, but withdrew from the tournament due to injury.

Ai Sugiyama won the title, defeating Nadia Petrova in the final 7–5, 6–4.

Seeds
The top four seeds received a bye into the second round.

Draw

Finals

Top half

Bottom half

Qualifying

Seeds

Qualifiers

Draw

First qualifier

Second qualifier

Third qualifier

Fourth qualifier

References
 Main and Qualifying Draws (ITF)

Generali Ladies Linz - Singles